Glory Sky is a 1962 Greek war film directed by Takis Kanellopoulos. It was entered into the 1963 Cannes Film Festival.

Cast
 Aimilia Pitta - Sofia
 Phaedon Georgitsis - Stratos
 Takis Emmanuel - Giagos
 Eleni Zafeiriou
 Niki Triantafillidi - Anthoula
 Lambrini Dimitriadou
 Giorgos Fourniadis
 Kostas Karagiorgis
 Christoforos Malamas
 Costas Messaris - (as Kostas Angelou)
 Lazos Terzas
 Stavros Tornes
 Nikos Tsachiridis

References

External links

1962 films
1962 war films
1960s Greek-language films
Greek black-and-white films
Films directed by Takis Kanellopoulos
Greek war films